Hyatt was a Serrano-class destroyer of the Chilean Navy from 1928 to 1967. She was laid down in 1927 by Thornycroft, at Woolston, Hampshire, England. She was launched by Mrs Margarita L. de Cubillos in November 1928, and commissioned in April 1929.

Hyatt was one of six vessels in its class to serve Chile.  The class was ordered from the United Kingdom and delivered in 1928 and 1929.  Like its sister ships  and  it was also equipped with mine laying capability.  The vessels had a displacement of 1450 tonnes and were armed with three /45 and one /40 DP gun as well as six 21-inch torpedo tubes.  The ships could make , but their light built proved unsuitable for the harsh southern waters off Chile's coast.

References

External links
Official description from the Chilean Navy 

 

Serrano-class destroyers
Ships built in Southampton
1928 ships
World War II destroyers of Chile